Notorious is the second book in The It Girl series, released in 2006. It was written by a ghostwriter with suggestions from Cecily von Ziegesar.  Aimed toward young adults, it is a spin-off from the bestselling Gossip Girl series.

Synopsis

After a long summer, Tinsley Carmichael returns to Waverly Academy, hoping to regain her place as the "It Girl". However, she receives a rude shock when she discovers that Jenny Humphrey is living in her old room, and upon their introduction, Tinsley immediately dislikes her. Despite her hopes, her friendship with Callie Vernon and Brett Messerschmidt is no longer what it used to be.

Tinsley hears rumors about Brett and the young new teacher Eric Dalton, and decides to meet him. She seduces him almost immediately. She also starts a new "club", called Cafe Society, of which Brett and Jenny are, at first, a part of. Tinsley soon kicks Jenny out because of rumors of her and Easy Walsh, which Jenny denies, but Tinsley then confirms when she sees them sneaking around together. She also kicks Brett out, because she believes she is a traitor in siding with Jenny, and also because she enjoys taunting Brett.

Torn between a relationship with Easy and school popularity, Jenny kisses a pizza delivery boy, Angelo, at a Cafe Society meeting to fit in with the other members. Ultimately, she chooses Easy, which generates ire from Callie. However, early in the relationship Easy hears rumors about Jenny's infidelity, causing him to end the relationship before it really begins.

Callie is still having problems coping with her now-dead relationship with Easy. She suspects Jenny has feelings for him as well, and may be trying to steal him. This causes a major strain on her newly formed, tentative friendship with Jenny. Callie easily picks up her old friendship with Tinsley after a few awkward days and a couple of much-needed explanations. After Easy breaks up with Callie in favour of Jenny, she and Tinsely vow revenge on the new couple.

Brett gains a new best friend in Jenny, as well as a new enemy in her old friend Tinsley. She becomes heartbroken when Eric breaks up with her, and is furious when she finds out he is now in a relationship with Tinsley. With Easy's assistance, she takes Dalton down by getting him fired for accounts of drug possession. Eventually, she gets back with Jeremiah, her ex-boyfriend from St. Lucius, after Jenny leaves a message on his phone about how much Brett is still in love with him.

Jeremiah plays the message for Easy when they are at a Cafe Society overnight trip in Boston, and both of them leave immediately for their girls back home at Waverly.

Brandon Buchanan still has feelings for Callie and thinks he has a chance when Easy breaks up with her. However, Callie doesn't want to be with him, even if she (drunkenly) kissed him good night on the way to her dorm. He drags along to the Boston trip to keep an eye on her and she loudly and drunkenly tells him off in front of everyone.

The perpetually horny Heath Ferro gets caught with Tinsley and Callie, the three almost naked, on the balcony of their Boston hotel room by the dean of Waverly, who is in the next room over with his equally married coworker.  An awkward conversation ensues, in which the dean tells the three to get back to Waverly in two hours or else.

When Callie and Tinsley arrive late, thanks to Callie's hungover vomiting attack, Dean Marymount decides to split up the girls of Dumbarton 303, moving Tinsley and her ex-best friend Brett downstairs and keeping Callie and her most hated enemy Jenny in their current room.

References

2006 American novels
American young adult novels
Chick lit novels
Novels by Cecily von Ziegesar